Baba Yaga: Terror of the Dark Forest is a 2020 Russian fantasy horror film based on the Slavic tale of Baba Yaga. The film was directed by Svyatoslav Podgayevsky about a strange nanny who looks after the youngest daughter in a family that moved to the outskirts of the city, the film stars Oleg Chugunov, Glafira Golubeva, Artyom Zhigulin, Svetlana Ustinova, Maryana Spivak and Aleksey Rozin.

The film was released in Russia on February 27, 2020. The distributor is Central Partnership.

Plot
The film centers on a young family that moves to a new apartment in the outskirts of the big city. The nanny they hired to look after their newborn daughter quickly becomes trustworthy. However, the eldest boy, Egor, notices frightening behavior of the woman, but his parents do not believe him. The surveillance cameras installed by his father for reassurance only confirm that everything is in order. However, one day, Egor returns home and does not find any traces of either the nanny and his little sister. His parents seem to be in a strange trance and do not even remember that they have ever had a daughter. Then Egor together with his friends arranges a search, during which they find out that the disappeared nanny is actually an ancient Slavic demon.

Cast
 Oleg Chugunov as Egor
 Glafira Golubeva as Dasha 	
 Artyom Zhigulin as Anton	
 Svetlana Ustinova as Tatyana, nanny / Baba Yaga
 Maryana Spivak as Yuliya, stepmother 	
 Aleksey Rozin as Alexey, father 
 Igor Khripunov as Mrachnyy
  as Seta 
 Evgeniya Evstigneeva as Egor's mother
 Olga Makeeva as Dasha's mother
 Ilya Ludin as Micha

Production
Baba Yaga: Terror of the Dark Forest will go to the United States and Latin America - Ledafilms acquired all rights, including movie theater rental, in these territories. The film will also be released in Vietnam & Indonesia (CGV), Malaysia (GSC), Singapore (Purple Plan), Taiwan (GaragePlay) & Hong Kong (mm2 Entertainment) and other countries in Southeast Asia (Suraya Filem), Japan (IPA Asia) and the Baltic States (Garsu).

Filming
Principal photography in April to June 2018 in Mozhaysky District, Moscow, the Skolkovo Innovation Center.

Release 
The film was released in Russia by Central Partnership on February 27, 2020, and the world premiere of March 1, 2020.

References

External links 
 

2020 films
2020s Russian-language films
2020s supernatural horror films
2020 fantasy films
2020s monster movies
2020s teen horror films
Russian supernatural horror films
Films about nannies
Films about babies
Films about children
Films set in forests
Films about shapeshifting
Films about child abuse
Dark fantasy films
Films based on fairy tales
Films based on Slavic mythology
Russian dark fantasy films